Dudleya cochimiana, commonly known as the Cedros liveforever, is a species of succulent plant in the family Crassulaceae endemic to Cedros Island, a large island off of the coast of Baja California, Mexico. It is a rosette-forming leaf succulent characterized by broad, green to white leaves, and flowers with white to pink petals. It can be found on rocky slopes and canyons along the island.

Taxonomy 
This species was first known as Dudleya cedrosensis, a name given to the plants by Reid Moran in his 1951 thesis on Dudleya. The failure of the thesis to be published meant that Dudleya cedrosensis was never a valid species, as Moran had difficulty reconciling some morphological differences between plants on the island. Although distinct, it was often regarded as a synonym of Dudleya ingens, due to the type collection being later identified as D. ingens aff, and sometimes associated with Dudleya albiflora.

In 2023, Stephen McCabe validly published and described Dudleya cochimiana in Madroño, which encompasses roughly the same plants Moran assigned to D. cedrosensis. McCabe named the new species in honor of the indigenous peoples of the central Baja California peninsula, the Cochimi.

See also

 Dudleya ingens
 Dudleya gatesii
 Dudleya albiflora

References

External links 

 Picture of the plant in flower
 Reid Moran's photograph of the plant

cedrosensis
Flora of Baja California